Tassel is a French surname. Notable people with the surname include:

Emile Tassel, original owner of Hôtel Tassel
George "Corn" Tassel 
Richard Tassel (1582–1660), French painter

See also
Van Tassel
Tassell

French-language surnames